Itsuko (variously written: 逸子 or 伊都子, 伊津子, 慈子, 五子, 五十子, 以津子, 衣津子, 溢子, 聿子) is a feminine Japanese given name. Notable people with the name include:

 (born 1941), Japanese architect
Itsuko Sue Nishikawa (died 2004), American baptist
 (1882-1976), daughter or  Nabeshima Naohiro and mother of Bangja, Crown Princess Euimin of Korea

Japanese feminine given names